Jia Yong, formerly MV Shen Neng 1 is a Chinese bulk carrier built in 1993 as Bestore. She was sold in 2007 and renamed Shen Neng 1. In 2010, she ran aground off Great Keppel Island, Australia, spilling oil into Great Barrier Reef waters.

Construction
The ship is powered by a 2-stroke Single Action 6-cylinder Sulzer 6RTA62 diesel engine driving a single screw propeller.

History
Bestore was owned by Scinicariello Ship Management, Italy. Her callsign is BXAN. She was allocated IMO number 9040871, and the MMSI 413461550. The ship is owned by Shenzhen Energy Transportation Co. Ltd, a subsidiary of Shenzhen Energy, whose logo appears on her funnel, and is managed by TOSCO‐KEYMAX International Ship Management Co. Ltd , a Sino-Japanese joint venture, and carries a crew of 23.

Great Barrier Reef grounding

 
At the time of the grounding, Shen Neng 1 was reported to have been travelling at full speed. The ship's engine and rudder were damaged in the grounding. The ship went aground  outside the shipping lane. It is in a restricted area which forms part of the Great Barrier Reef Marine Park, a World Heritage Site designated by UNESCO.

As a result of the grounding, the fuel tanks of the vessel were punctured, allowing fuel oil to leak from the vessel. It was feared that the ship might break in two. 2,000 litres of the chemical dispersant Corexit 9527 was applied to the oil slick.

A salvage contract was awarded to Svitzer, led by Jan Polderman SVITZER Salvage B.V. and Drew Shannon of SVITZER Salvage Australia, who co-ordinated the salvage response. Salvage engineers from Australia and marine surveyors assisted stabilise the vessel, coordinate resources and provide expert advice to salvage masters acting at the time. Shen Neng 1 was refloated on 12 April 2010, after forecasts of bad weather meant that the salvage operation was brought forward. There were reports that large areas of the coral reef were damaged by the ship. On 14 April, the captain and officer on watch at the time of the accident were arrested. They were charged and appeared in court on 15 April.

Investigation
Two investigations have been opened into the grounding. The investigations are being conducted by the Australian Maritime Safety Authority (AMSA) and the Australian Transport Safety Bureau (ATSB). Queensland Premier Anna Bligh said that the Government would be investigating why the ship was so far off route. It was reported that the ship's owner could be fined $1,000,000 and Shen Neng 1's captain $220,000.

The ATSB despatched three investigators to Gladstone, Queensland, on 4 April to collect evidence and conduct interviews. On 6 April they boarded the ship to interview the crew members and collect further evidence. The preliminary phase of the investigation was scheduled to take 28 days. A casualty co-ordinator from the AMSA boarded the ship. Three vessels were reported as giving assistance at the scene. The preliminary investigation has found fatigue as the major contributor to the grounding. Prior to the grounding, there were no checks to ensure fatigue was minimized by the governing authorities (AMSA). A news story claimed that the ship was attempting to take a shortcut when it ran aground.

See also
 List of oil spills

References

External links

 Jia Yong at VesselTracker

1993 ships
Merchant ships of Italy
Merchant ships of China
Maritime incidents in 2010
Shipwrecks in the Coral Sea